Kronauer or Krönauer is a surname. People with the name include:

 Brigitte Kronauer (1940–2019), German writer and novelist
 Hansl Krönauer (1932-2011), German folk-singer and composer
 Richard Ernest Kronauer, Gordon McKay Professor of Mechanical Engineering
 Steven Kronauer, American conductor and tenor 

Surnames
German toponymic surnames